Rudolf Haag (17 August 1922 – 5 January 2016) was a German theoretical physicist, who mainly dealt with fundamental questions of quantum field theory. He was one of the founders of the modern formulation of quantum field theory and he identified the formal structure in terms of the principle of locality and local observables. He also made important advances in the foundations of quantum statistical mechanics.

Biography 
Rudolf Haag was born on 17 August 1922, in Tübingen, a university town in the middle of Baden-Württemberg. His family belonged to the cultured middle class. Haag's mother was the writer and politician Anna Haag. His father, Albert Haag, was a teacher of mathematics at a Gymnasium. After finishing high-school in 1939, he visited his sister in London shortly before the beginning of World War II. He was interned as an enemy alien and spent the war in a camp of German civilians in Manitoba. There he used his spare-time after the daily compulsory labour to study physics and mathematics as an autodidact.

After the war, Haag returned to Germany and enrolled at the Technical University of Stuttgart in 1946, where he graduated as a physicist in 1948. In 1951, he received his doctorate at the University of Munich under the supervision of Fritz Bopp and became his assistant until 1956. In April 1953, he joined the CERN theoretical study group in Copenhagen directed by Niels Bohr. After a year, he returned to his assistant position in Munich and completed the German habilitation in 1954. From 1956 to 1957 he worked with Werner Heisenberg at the Max Planck Institute for Physics in Göttingen.

From 1957 to 1959, he was a visiting professor at Princeton University and from 1959 to 1960 he worked at the University of Marseille. He became a professor of Physics at the University of Illinois Urbana-Champaign in 1960. In 1965, he and Res Jost founded the journal Communications in Mathematical Physics. Haag remained the first editor-in-chief until 1973. In 1966, he accepted the professorship position for theoretical physics at the University of Hamburg, where he stayed until he retired in 1987. After retirement, he worked on the concept of the quantum physical event.

Haag developed an interest in music at an early age. He began learning the violin, but later preferred the piano, which he played almost every day. In 1948, Haag married Käthe Fues, with whom he had four children, Albert, Friedrich, Elisabeth, and Ulrich. After retirement, he moved together with his second wife Barbara Klie to Schliersee, a pastoral village in the Bavarian mountains. He died on 5 January 2016, in Fischhausen-Neuhaus, in southern Bavaria.

Scientific career 
At the beginning of his career, Haag contributed significantly to the concepts of quantum field theory, including Haag's theorem, from which follows that the interaction picture of quantum mechanics does not exist in quantum field theory. A new approach to the description of scattering processes of particles became necessary. In the following years Haag developed what is known as Haag–Ruelle scattering theory.

During this work, he realized that the rigid relationship between fields and particles that had been postulated up to that point, did not exist, and that the particle interpretation should be based on Albert Einstein's principle of locality, which assigns operators to regions of spacetime. These insights found their final formulation in the Haag–Kastler axioms for local observables of quantum field theories. This framework uses elements of the theory of operator algebras and is therefore referred to as algebraic quantum field theory or, from the physical point of view, as local quantum physics.

This concept proved fruitful for understanding the fundamental properties of any theory in four-dimensional Minkowski space. Without making assumptions about non-observable charge-changing fields, Haag, in collaboration with Sergio Doplicher and John E. Roberts, elucidated the possible structure of the superselection sectors of the observables in theories with short-range forces. Sectors can always be composes with one another, each sector satisfies either para-Bose or para-Fermi statistics and for each sector there is a conjugate sector. These insights correspond to the additivity of charges in the particle interpretation, to the Bose–Fermi alternative for particle statistics, and to the existence of antiparticles. In the special case of simple sectors, a global gauge group and charge-carrying fields, which can generate all sectors from the vacuum state, were reconstructed from the observables. These results were later generalized for arbitrary sectors in the Doplicher–Roberts duality theorem. The application of these methods to theories in low-dimensional spaces also led to an understanding of the occurrence of braid group statistics and quantum groups.

In quantum statistical mechanics, Haag, together with Nicolaas M. Hugenholtz and Marius Winnink, succeeded in generalizing the Gibbs–von Neumann characterization of thermal equilibrium states using the KMS condition (named after Ryogo Kubo, Paul C. Martin, and Julian Schwinger) in such a way that it extends to infinite systems in the thermodynamic limit. It turned out that this condition also plays a prominent role in the theory of von Neumann algebras and resulted in the Tomita–Takesaki theory. This theory has proven to be a central element in structural analysis and recently also in the construction of concrete quantum field theoretical models. Together with Daniel Kastler and Ewa Trych-Pohlmeyer, Haag also succeeded in deriving the KMS condition from the stability properties of thermal equilibrium states. Together with Huzihiro Araki, Daniel Kastler, and Masamichi Takesaki, he also developed a theory of chemical potential in this context.

The framework created by Haag and Kastler for studying quantum field theories in Minkowski space can be transferred to theories in curved spacetime. By working with Klaus Fredenhagen, Heide Narnhofer, and Ulrich Stein, Haag made important contributions to the understanding of the Unruh effect and Hawking radiation.

Haag had a certain mistrust towards what he viewed as speculative developments in theoretical physics but occasionally dealt with such questions. The best known contribution is the Haag–Łopuszański–Sohnius theorem, which classifies the possible supersymmetries of the S-matrix that are not covered by the Coleman–Mandula theorem.

Honors and awards 
In 1970 Haag received the Max Planck Medal for outstanding achievements in theoretical physics and in 1997 the Henri Poincaré Prize for his fundamental contributions to quantum field theory as one of the founders of the modern formulation. Since 1980 Haag was a member of the German National Academy of Sciences Leopoldina and since 1981 of the Göttingen Academy of Sciences. Since 1979 he was a corresponding member of the Bavarian Academy of Sciences and since 1987 of the Austrian Academy of Sciences.

Publications

Textbook

Selected scientific works 

  (Haag's theorem.)

  (Haag–Ruelle scattering theory.)

  (Haag–Kastler axioms.)

 

  (Doplicher-Haag-Roberts analysis of the superselection structure.)

  (KMS condition.)

  (Stability and KMS condition.)

  (KMS condition and chemical potential.)

  (Unruh effect.)

  (Hawking radiation.)

  (Classification of Supersymmetry.)

  (Concept of Event.)

Others

See also 

 Axiomatic quantum field theory
 Communications in Mathematical Physics
 Constructive quantum field theory
 Haag–Łopuszański–Sohnius theorem
 Haag–Ruelle scattering theory
 Haag's theorem
 Hilbert's sixth problem
 Local quantum physics
 Principle of locality
 Quantum field theory
 Quantum field theory in curved spacetime

Notes

References

Further reading 
 
  (With photo).
  (With photo).

External links 

 .
 .
 .
 .
 
 

20th-century German physicists
21st-century German physicists
Academic staff of the University of Hamburg
Winners of the Max Planck Medal
Members of the Austrian Academy of Sciences
Members of the Bavarian Academy of Sciences
Members of the German Academy of Sciences Leopoldina
1922 births
2016 deaths
People associated with CERN